There are five main causes of infections of the central nervous system (CNS): bacterial, viral, fungal, protozoal, and prionic.

Fungal
 Cryptococcal meningitis
 Brain abscess
 Spinal epidural infection

Protozoal
 Toxoplasmosis
 Malaria
 Primary amoebic meningoencephalitis
 Granulomatous amoebic encephalitis
 Amoebic brain abscess

Viral
 Viral meningitis
 Eastern equine encephalitis
 St Louis encephalitis
 Japanese encephalitis
 West Nile encephalitis
 Tick-borne encephalitis
 Herpes simplex encephalitis
 Rabies
 California encephalitis virus
 Varicella-zoster encephalitis
 La Crosse encephalitis
 Measles encephalitis
 Nipah virus encephalitis
 Poliomyelitis
 Slow virus infections, which include:
 Subacute sclerosing panencephalitis
 Progressive multifocal leukoencephalopathy
 Acquired immunodeficiency syndrome (AIDS)

Prionic

 Creutzfeldt–Jakob disease and its variant
 Gerstmann–Sträussler–Scheinker syndrome
 Kuru
 Variably protease-sensitive prionopathy
 Familial spongiform encephalopathy

Post-infectious diseases of the central nervous system
 PANDAS (controversial hypothesis)
 Sydenham's chorea
 Acute disseminated encephalomyelitis
 Guillain–Barré syndrome

See also
 Central nervous system viral disease
 Encephalitis
 Meningitis
 Neuroepidemiology
 Neurovirology

References

Central nervous system disorders
Infectious diseases